= Laurie Jade Woodruff =

English writer of erotica

- Born: United Kingdom
- Occupations: Author, writer, Actress
- Writing career
- Language: English
- Genres: Erotica, Fiction

Laurie Jade Woodruff is an English actress, author and writer of erotica.

Woodruff is known for the work Diary of a Sex Addict, which was released on 14 February 2019.

== Personal life ==
Woodruff had a son, Arthur, who died of Sudden Infant Death Syndrome in 2015. She went on to have a second son named Henry.
